The Buick Blackhawk is a retro concept 2+2 convertible built by Buick in 2003. Its grille is based on 1939 Buick automobiles and the Buick Y-Job concept car, while its main body is based on the 1948 Buick Roadmaster. It features a retractable hardtop, shaved door handles, and hidden headlights.

The engine is mated to an electronically controlled four-speed automatic transmission.

The vehicle is entirely handmade, including the carbon-fiber top and the frame. The retraction system is also handmade. The Blackhawk also features a fully independent suspension, keyless entry, and dual exhaust with  pipes. The vehicle also has  five-spoke alloy wheels with high-speed Z-rated tires. GPS is also provided. The interior is based on the 1996 Buick Riviera.

The car was featured in the film Bad Boys II. It was driven by actor Will Smith after the mortuary scene.

On January 17, 2009, it was sold for $522,500 (including buyer premium) by Barrett-Jackson .

References

Blackhawk
Retro-style automobiles